Bibliothèque Royale 'Royal library' may refer to:

 Bibliothèque Royale de Belgique, Royal Library of Belgium
 Bibliothèque du Roi, France, the predecessor of the Bibliothèque nationale de France

See also
 Royal Library (disambiguation)